Liam Anthony Patterson-White (born 8 November 1998) is an English cricketer. He made his first-class debut on 7 July 2019, for Nottinghamshire in the 2019 County Championship. He made his List A debut on 25 July 2021, for Nottinghamshire  in the 2021 Royal London One-Day Cup. In August 2021, during the 2021 County Championship, he scored his maiden century in first-class cricket.

References

External links
 

1998 births
Living people
English cricketers
Nottinghamshire cricketers
Cricketers from Sunderland